Hunsdon Airfield is an airfield near Hunsdon, Hertfordshire and  north of Harlow, Essex, England. As of 2021, it is used by a local microlight club.

The airfield was used by the Royal Air Force between 1941 and 1945 under the name of RAF Hunsdon.

History

RAF Hunsdon became operational in 1941.  The first unit to arrive at the Airfield (in May 1941) was No. 85 Squadron RAF, flying Boston Havocs.

In June No. 1451 Flight RAF was formed. This experimental unit flew Bostons with searchlights fitted in the nose of the aircraft. This experiment was not successful and the unit was reformed as No. 530 Squadron RAF in September 1942. Numerous Squadrons and Wings used the airfield during its operational life.  Hunsdon is most closely associated, however, with the de Havilland Mosquito, which first arrived in 1943.

On 18 February 1944, Mosquitos from No. 21 Squadron RAF, 464 Squadron (Australia) RAF, and 487 Squadron (New Zealand) RAF which formed No 140 Wing (Wing Commander P C Pickard DSO DFC) carried out Operation Jericho, otherwise known as the Amiens Prison Raid.

Military flying ceased in 1945.

Post 1945 

The last remaining blister hangar at Hunsdon was demolished in the mid 2000s as it was made unsafe after the great storm of 1987.

Today only a few original buildings remain of the former RAF Hunsdon. One such building is the Underground Battle Headquarters, which was designed to provide emergency organisation of airfield defenses should the airfield come under attack. Other remaining buildings include defensive pillboxes, a brick slit trench used as a defence position, the fire tender building now used as a store for the shooting club, a complete cantilever 'Oakington' type defence position, 20mm ammunition store, and a Small arms ammunition store. All of the remaining buildings at Hunsdon Airfield are no longer accessible due to safety reasons.

On Number 3 dispersed site, there are the remains of latrines and air raid shelters. (These are on private land and permission to enter must be sought.)

On 22 May 2005, a memorial was unveiled and dedicated to the groundcrew, aircrew and support staff who were based at RAF Hunsdon from 1941 to 1945.

In June 2012 a new memorial commemorating the 126 air and ground crew who died while flying from or serving at RAF Hunsdon was unveiled.

The original runways are now considerably reduced in length. Hunsdon Microlight Club uses the three grass runways for microlight flying.

Units based at RAF Hunsdon

RAF units based here during the Second World War are:

Squadron table

Brief Stays

See also
 List of former Royal Air Force stations

References

Citations

Bibliography

External links

 Wartime Airfields website
 Hertfordshire Airfields Memorial Group
 Hunsdon Microlight Club

Airports in England
Transport in Hertfordshire
Airports in the East of England